Zygaena rhadamanthus is a species of moth in the Zygaenidae family. It is found in France, Spain, Portugal and Italy.

The larvae feed on Onobrychis, Dorycnium pentaphyllum and Lotus species. The species overwinters in the larval stage.

Technical description and variation

Z. rhadamanthus Esp. (6g). Forewing strongly transparent, glossy grey, with 6 red spots, the 2., 3., 4. and 5. being edged with black at the proximal and distal sides. Riviera and Catalonia. — cingulata Led. (6h) [ ab. of rhadamanthus] has a red belt. This is a normal form in Spain, while in Liguria only single individuals of it are found among typical specimens. —kiesenwetteri H.-Sch. [Z. rhadamanthus ssp. kiesenwetteri Herrich-Schäffer, 1852]   (6h) has quite a different aspect on account of the deep black ground-colour of the forewing and the black hindwing, resembling lavandulae or  stoechadis, but the black edges of the spots of the forewing are easily visible on the black ground. — algarbiensis Christ. [Z. rhadamanthus ssp. algarbiensis Christ, 1889] (= roederi Stgr.) (6h), from South Portugal, is similar, but the 6. spot of
the forewing is entirely obsolete or only slightly vestigial. — Larva variegated, grey, black, longitudinally striped with white and yellow, with red collar; in April full-grown on Dorycnium. Pupa in a white oval cocoon. The moths in spring till May, frequently sitting on stalks of grass.

Subspecies
Zygaena rhadamanthus rhadamanthus
Zygaena rhadamanthus alfacarensis Reiss, 1922
Zygaena rhadamanthus algarbiensis Christ, 1889
Zygaena rhadamanthus aragonia Tremewan, 1961 (Spain: provinces of Cuenca and Teruel)
Zygaena rhadamanthus aurargentea Mazel, 1979 (France: Pyrénées-Orientales, Spain: Barcelona and Girona)
Zygaena rhadamanthus azurea Burgeff, 1914 (France: départements of Var and Alpes-Maritimes)
Zygaena rhadamanthus caroniana Reiss, 1965
Zygaena rhadamanthus gredosica Reiss, 1936
Zygaena rhadamanthus grisea Oberthur, 1909 (south-eastern and southern-central France: from Alpes-de-Haute-Provence and Hautes-Alpes to Isère, Drôme, Ardèche, Vaucluse, Aveyron, Lot and Lozère)
Zygaena rhadamanthus guichardi Tremewan, 1991
Zygaena rhadamanthus isabelae Gonzalo Fidel, 1980
Zygaena rhadamanthus kiesenwetteri Herrich-Schaffer, 1852
Zygaena rhadamanthus rasura Agenjo, 1948
Zygaena rhadamanthus stygia Burgeff, 1914 (east of the River Var in Alpes-Maritimes in France to Imperia in Italy)

References

Moths described in 1789
Zygaena
Moths of Europe